The Budapest metropolitan area is a statistical area that describes the reach of commuter movement to and from Budapest and its surrounding suburbs. Created by Hungary's national statistical office HCSO to describe suburban development around centres of urban growth, the surrounding a more densely built and densely populated urban area. As of 2014 the Budapest metropolitan area, with its 7,626 km² (2,944 sq mi), extends significantly beyond Budapest's administrative region (encompasses 193 settlements around the city), a region also commonly referred to as Central Hungary. It had a population of 3,303,786 inhabitants at the January 2013 census, making it the tenth largest urban region in Europe (Larger urban zones in Europe). 33% of Hungary's population resides in the region.

Traffic

There are 4 subway lines, 36 tram lines, 18 suburban railway lines (operated by MÁV-Hungarian State Railways and BKV-Public Transport Company of Budapest also) and 601 bus lines in the metropolitan area (2006).

Motorways

Arterial motorways that also connects Budapest Metropolitan Area to the city center are M1 motorway (Hungary) from north-west, M2 motorway (Hungary) from north, M3 motorway (Hungary) from north-east with M31 motorway (Hungary) link, M4 motorway (Hungary) from east, M5 motorway (Hungary) from south-east with M51 motorway (Hungary) link, M6 motorway (Hungary) from south, M7 motorway (Hungary) from south-west.

M0 motorway (Hungary) ring-road of Budapest connects all arterial motorways.

Settlements of the Budapest metropolitan area

 Budapest
 Alsónémedi
 Biatorbágy
 Budajenő
 Budakalász
 Budakeszi
 Budaörs
 Csobánka
 Csomád
 Csömör
 Csörög
 Dabas
 Délegyháza
 Diósd
 Dunabogdány
 Dunaharaszti
 Dunakeszi

 Dunavarsány
 Ecser
 Erdőkertes
 Érd
 Felsőpakony
 Fót
 Göd
 Gödöllő
 Gyál
 Gyömrő
 Halásztelek
 Herceghalom
 Inárcs
 Isaszeg
 Kakucs
 Kerepes
 Kistarcsa

 Kisoroszi
 Leányfalu
 Majosháza
 Maglód
 Mogyoród
 Monor
 Nagykovácsi
 Nagytarcsa
 Ócsa
 Őrbottyán
 Páty
 Perbál
 Pécel
 Pilisborosjenő
 Piliscsaba
 Pilisjászfalu
 Pilisszántó
 Pilisszentiván

 Pilisszentkereszt
 Pilisszentlászló
 Pilisvörösvár
 Pomáz
 Pócsmegyer
 Pusztazámor
 Remeteszőlős
 Solymár
 Sóskút
 Szada
 Százhalombatta
 Szentendre
 Szigethalom
 Szigetmonostor
 Szigetszentmiklós
 Sződ
 Sződliget
 Tahitótfalu

 Taksony
 Tárnok
 Telki
 Tinnye
 Tök
 Tököl
 Törökbálint
 Újhartyán
 Újlengyel
 Üllő
 Üröm
 Vác
 Vácrátót
 Vecsés
 Veresegyház
 Visegrád
 Zsámbék

References

 
Metropolitan area
Metropolitan areas of Hungary